Tianjin International Trade Centre is a skyscraper complex with 57 floors and a floor area of 190,350 m², which is at 112 Munan Road in Tianjin, China.

Construction of Tianjin International Trade Centre commenced in 1998 but was halted in July 2000. Its construction recommenced on 25 November 2010 and it topped out on 11 July 2012. It was completed in 2014.

References

External links
 
 

Skyscraper office buildings in Tianjin
Buildings and structures under construction in China
Residential skyscrapers in China
Skyscraper hotels in Tianjin
Retail buildings in China
Skyscrapers in Tianjin